The 2021 Laser Radial World Championships were held from 29 November to 6 December 2021 in Al-Musannah, Oman.

Medal summary

References

External links 
 Official website

Laser Radial World Championships
Raceboard World Championships
Sailing competitions in Oman
2021 in Omani sport